Michael James Bingham (born 21 May 1981) is an English former professional footballer who played in the Football League for Mansfield Town.

References

1981 births
Living people
English footballers
Association football goalkeepers
English Football League players
Mansfield Town F.C. players
Blackburn Rovers F.C. players
Hednesford Town F.C. players